The Canadian province of Alberta has five area codes.

In 1947, when the American Telephone and Telegraph Company (AT&T) established the first continental telephone numbering plan, Alberta was included as a single numbering plan area, which received area code 403. This included the Arctic territories. The area code was split in 1999 to place Northern Alberta (including Edmonton) in area code 780.

In 2008, both of the province's numbering plan areas were overlaid with area code 587. On April 9, 2016, the province was again overlaid, with area code 825. Area code 368 was assigned on April 23, 2022.

403: Southern Alberta, original area code
780: Northern Alberta
587: Created in 2008, overlays all of Alberta
825: Created in 2016, overlays all of Alberta
368: Created in 2022, overlays all of Alberta

References

See also 

 Telephone numbers in Canada
 Canadian Numbering Administration Consortium

Alberta
Area codes
Area codes